These are the results of the men's singles competition in badminton at the 2008 Summer Olympics in Beijing.

The tournament consisted of a single-elimination tournament. Matches were played using a best-of-three games format. Games were played to 21 points, using rally scoring. Each game had to be won by a margin of two points, except when the game was won by a player who reached 30 even if the lead was only 1 at that point.

The top eight seeds in the tournament were placed in the bracket so as not to face each other until the quarterfinals. All other competitors were placed by draw.

Seeds

   (gold medalist)
   (silver medalist)
   (quarter-finals)
   (bronze medalist)
  (second round)
  (quarter-finals)
  (second round)
  (quarter-finals)

Draw

Finals

Section 1

Section 2

Section 3

Section 4

Men's singles
Men's events at the 2008 Summer Olympics